{{Infobox person
| name         = Chris Jarvis
| image        = 
| birth_name   = Martin Christopher Jarvis
| birth_date   =  
| birth_place  = Romford, London, England
| occupation   = Actor, broadcaster, director, impressionist, presenter, writer
| nationality  = British
| television   = Playdays Fully BookedCatchphraseJungle RunStep Inside CBeebies
}}

Martin Christopher Jarvis (born 20 April 1969) is an English actor, presenter and writer who has appeared mainly on children's television for the BBC since 1992, apart from 2000 to 2002 when he was working with ITV and Channel 4. In 2019, he started a radio station for children called Little Radio.

Career

Early career
Jarvis made his name in the early 1990s on Children's BBC, presenting from the "Broom Cupboard" alongside Zoe Ball and Josie d'Arby as well as hosting his own shows like Look Sharp. Chris wrote a lot of material for Children's BBC himself (including the mini soap opera Wood Lane TV) and created several memorable characters including "The Anorak".
In 1997, Chris was part of The Friday Zone (which was broadcast on Friday afternoons on BBC One for most of the children's slot) with Debra Stephenson, Peter Simon, Dominic Wood, Steve Rock and Emma Lee. They released a single called "Glasses" as a spin-off from the programme, to raise money for Comic Relief.

He then hosted Fully Booked with Tim Vincent and Gail Porter for a few years. He has appeared on many other TV shows including Short Change, Exclusive, Playdays and Soap Fever.

CBeebies
Chris was one of the original lineup of CBeebies presenters, alongside Pui Fan Lee, Sidney Sloane, and Sue Monroe every day. From March 2007 until his departure on 2 January 2009, he presented alongside Lee from 9:00 am to 3:00 pm with Discover and Do, then the Bedtime Hour from 6:00 pm and again on BBC Two in the mornings.  He also starred in Step Inside as Mr Mopple and voiced characters in Underground Ernie. In 2009, he and Lee left the channel's main presentation to create Show Me Show Me.Show Me Show Me is still broadcast on CBeebies today. The first 40 half-hour episodes were broadcast on the CBeebies channel, BBC One and BBC Two from Monday 6 July 2009 every weekday at 10:00 am and 1:30 pm. Series 5 was filmed on location near Manchester in 2013.

Chris and Pui regularly appear in other CBeebies shows, including Justin's House and the annual Christmas shows; in 2012 Chris wrote Jack and the Beanstalk and played Dame Trott. He has also appeared in productions of Shakespeare plays that have aired on CBeebies playing Snout in A Midsummer Night's Dream and King Alonso in The Tempest.

Since 2010, Chris and Pui have toured the UK with The Chris and Pui Roadshow.

Besides Show Me Show Me he also presents CBeebies Stargazing with Maggie Aderin-Pocock and has presented the CBeebies Prom at the Royal Albert Hall.

Acting
As an actor Chris Jarvis has appeared in The Demon Headmaster and ChuckleVision, and played Mr Mopple in early CBeebies story-telling programme Step Inside. He also presented Maths Mansion.

Music
Jarvis hosts family concerts for the London Philharmonic Orchestra LPO and the BBC Philharmonic Orchestra.

He has been seen playing piano, guitar, glockenspiel and bell-ringing on Show Me Show Me.

Pantomime
Jarvis has appeared in pantomimes professionally every year since 1995, and prior to that had performed in several as an amateur. Since 2001, he has written and directed many of these pantomimes as well.

 1995 'Aladdin' Guildford – Bernie Nolan, Clare Buckfield, Jack Douglas, Richard Gibson,
 1996 'Aladdin' Richmond – Bonnie Langford, Bernard Cribbins, Terrence Hardiman
 1997 'Jack & the Beanstalk' Bromley – Matthew Kelly, Vicki Michelle, Toyah Willcox, Robert Duncan,
 1998 'Cinderella' Lewisham – Linda Robson, Femi Oke
 1999 'Peter Pan' Reading – Derek Griffiths, Hilary O'Neil
 2000 'Jack & the Beanstalk' Croydon – Kate Ritchie,
 2001 'Cinderella' Malvern – Marti Webb, Nicholas Smith
 2002 'Cinderella' Bournemouth – Ruth Madoc, Nicholas Smith
 2003 'Cinderella' Basingstoke – Sarah Thomas, Michael Knowles
 2004 'Jack & the Beanstalk' Bournemouth – Chris Ellison, Tom Owen, Jackie Piper
 2005 'Aladdin' Bournemouth – Ray Meagher, Mark Squires
 2006 'Snow White' Tunbridge Wells – Carol Harrison, Richard Calkin
 2007 'Snow White' Basingstoke – Carol Harrison, Tom Owen
 2008 'Cinderella' Swansea – Su Pollard, Sarah Thomas
 2009 'Snow White' at the Pavilion Theatre, Bournemouth with Su PollardBournemouth International Centre – Jack and the Beanstalk 
 2010 'Cinderella' at the Pavilion Theatre, Bournemouth with Amanda Barrie.
 2011 'Jack & the Beanstalk' at the Pavilion Theatre, Bournemouth with Debra Stephenson, Brian Capron, Nick Wilton & Kate Weston
 2012 'Sleeping Beauty' at the Pavilion Theatre, Bournemouth with Su Pollard.
 2013 'Aladdin' at the Pavilion Theatre, Bournemouth with Scott Maslen, Bobby Crush, Nicholas Khan, Jennifer Saayeng, Richard Vincent, Jamie-Lee Mason
 2014 'Snow White'  Richmond Theatre  – Jerry Hall
 2015 'Cinderella' Richmond Theatre
 2016 'Sleeping Beauty' Richmond Theatre
 2017 'Jack and the Beanstalk' Wycombe Swan Theatre with Simon Webbe and Ashleigh Butler
 2018 'Dick Whittington' Poole Lighthouse with Richard Gibson
 2019 'Sleeping Beauty' Swindon Wyvern with Michelle Collins
 2020 Puss in Boots Tiring Production with Suzanne Shaw
 2021 'Beauty & the Beast' Poole Lighthouse 
 2022 'Cinderella' Poole Lighthouse with Tyger Drew-Honey, Alim Jadavji, Andrew Pollard, Charlotte Wood and Lauren Azania

Jarvis has been involved with several televised pantomimes on CBeebies, including 2012's Jack and the beanstalk which he wrote and starred Dame Trot, 2011's Strictly Cinderella which he co-wrote, and starred in as Baron Hardup, 2010's Aladdin (in which he plays Emperor Sho Mee) and 2009's Jack & Jill'' (which he wrote and appeared in a cameo).

Personal life
Jarvis grew up in Billericay and Brentwood.

He is the godfather to one of fellow CBeebies presenter Pui Fan Lee's sons.

He is 5'9" tall.

Filmography

References

External links
 
  
 

1969 births
Living people
British male television actors
British television presenters
People from Romford